Seated Peasant is a late 19th-century painting by Paul Cézanne. Done in oil on canvas, the work depicts a seated peasant, likely a worker at Jas de Bouffan, Cézanne's family estate in Aix-en-Provence. The painting's age is unknown but credibly dated between 1892 and 1896. It is currently in the collection of the Metropolitan Museum of Art.

See also
List of paintings by Paul Cézanne

References

1890s paintings
Paintings in the collection of the Metropolitan Museum of Art
Paintings by Paul Cézanne